Jordan Ikoko (born 3 February 1994) is a Congolese footballer who plays as a right-back for Cypriot First Division club Pafos and the DR Congo national team.

Ikoko began his senior career with Paris Saint-Germain but did not make a first team appearance and spent time on loan at Créteil, Le Havre and Lens. In the summer of 2016, he joined Guingamp. Ikoko spent three seasons with the Ligue 1 team and totalled 83 competitive appearances before moving to Ludogorets in June 2019.

Ikoko was born in France and represented the country from under-16 to under-21 level. He then changed his allegiance to DR Congo, for whom he made his senior international debut in 2017.

Career

Paris Saint-Germain and loans
Born in Montereau, France, Ikoko is a youth product of Paris Saint-Germain.

Ikoko made his Ligue 2 debut with Créteil on 16 August 2013 in a 3–0 away defeat against SM Caen. He replaced Augusto Pereira Loureiro in the 63rd minute. One week later, he played the full 90 minutes against FC Istres in a 2–2 home draw.

On 15 July 2014, Ikoko was loaned to Ligue 2 club Le Havre.

On 23 July 2015, Ikoko joined Ligue 2 club Lens for a season-long loan deal.

Guingamp
On 19 June 2016, Ikoko signed a three-year contract with Guingamp. He made his competitive debut on 12 August in the club's opening game of the Ligue 1 season, playing the full 90 minutes in a 2–2 draw against Monaco at Stade Louis II.

On 13 August 2017, Ikoko scored an own goal in a 0–3 home defeat to Paris Saint-Germain.

Ludogorets
On 16 June 2019, Ikoko signed a contract with Bulgarian club Ludogorets Razgrad for a reported transfer fee of €1 million. He made his debut in the 2019 Bulgarian Supercup on 3 July at Vasil Levski National Stadium, playing the full 90 minutes as Ludogorets won against Lokomotiv Plovdiv.

Pafos
In August 2022, he joined the ranks of Cypriot team Pafos.

International career
Ikoko was born in France to parents of Congolese descent. He was a youth international for France at various levels. He was formally capped by the DR Congo national football team in a friendly 2–0 loss to Cameroon on 5 January 2017. He was also selected in DR Congo's final squad for the 2017 Africa Cup of Nations in Gabon where he played his first official match for the DR Congo national football team in 2–2 draw against Ivory Coast.

Career statistics

Club

Honours
Ludogorets
First Professional Football League (Bulgaria) (3): 2019–20, 2020–21, 2021–22
Bulgarian Supercup: 2019

References

External links
 
 

1994 births
Living people
Citizens of the Democratic Republic of the Congo through descent
Democratic Republic of the Congo footballers
Democratic Republic of the Congo international footballers
French footballers
France youth international footballers
France under-21 international footballers
Paris Saint-Germain F.C. players
US Créteil-Lusitanos players
Le Havre AC players
RC Lens players
En Avant Guingamp players
PFC Ludogorets Razgrad players
Ligue 1 players
Ligue 2 players
First Professional Football League (Bulgaria) players
Expatriate footballers in Bulgaria
2017 Africa Cup of Nations players
Association football defenders
Sportspeople from Loiret
Cyclists from Centre-Val de Loire
French sportspeople of Democratic Republic of the Congo descent
Black French sportspeople
Expatriate footballers in Cyprus
Pafos FC players
Cypriot First Division players